Wilson's Bridge is a bridge near Hagerstown, Washington County, Maryland, United States. The bridge was erected in 1819 by Silas Harry, who had built similar bridges in Pennsylvania. The bridge was closed in June 1972 when it was damaged by floods which occurred during Tropical Storm Agnes.

Wilson's Bridge was listed on the National Register of Historic Places in 1982.

See also
List of bridges documented by the Historic American Engineering Record in Maryland
List of bridges on the National Register of Historic Places in Maryland

References

External links

, including photo from 1984, at Maryland Historical Trust

Road bridges on the National Register of Historic Places in Maryland
Buildings and structures in Hagerstown, Maryland
Historic American Engineering Record in Maryland
Historic American Buildings Survey in Maryland
National Register of Historic Places in Washington County, Maryland
Stone arch bridges in the United States
Transportation buildings and structures in Washington County, Maryland